Two submarines of the French Navy have been named after the Porpoise, known in France as Marsouin:

French Navy ship names